Joseph Hodara (born July 23, 1938) is an Israeli sociologist and journalist. Hodara teaches at Bar-Ilan University.

Academic and media career
Between 1976 and 1990, he worked for the Mexican newspaper El Universal as a correspondent in the Middle East and Europe.

Hodara's main field is the social and scientific development of Latin American countries. Through his work in the United Nations Economic Commission for Latin America and the Caribbean and in UNESCO, he has helped to formulate relevant policies.

Publications

Books 
 "Científicos vs. Políticos", National Mexican University, Mexico 1969
 "Indicadores de Productividad Científica", Instituto de Investigaciones Sociales, Universidad Nacional Autónoma de México, México 1970
 "El fin de los intelectuales", Villarreal University, Lima, Peru 1973
 "Cooperación Económica en Centroamérica", Ed. Tecnos, México 1974
 "Términos Latinoamericanos para el Diccionario de Ciencias sociales", CLACSO-ILDIS, Buenos Aires, Argentina 1974
 "Tiene límites el crecimiento?" Ed. El Manual Moderno SA, México 1977
 "Los futuros de Mexico", Fomento Cultural Banamex, México 1978
 "En torno al capitalismo", IBAFIN, México 1983
 "Los estudios del futuro", IBAFIN, México 1984
 "Prebisch y la CEPAL", El Colegio de México, México 1987
 "Educación y modernización en México", Diana Editores, México 1992
 "Víctor L. Urquidi – Trayectorial intelectual", El Colegio de Mexico 2014
 "Víctor L. Urquidi, Obras Escogidas", vol. V, El Colegio de Mexico 2014
 "Víctor L. Urquidi – Entrevista en la ONU", El Colegio de México 2015
 "Miguel S. Wionczek y el petróleo mexicano", El Colegio de México, México 2017

Chapters in books 
 "Conflictos entre estructuras científicas y políticas, en Problemas de la predicción en las ciencias sociales, Instituto de investigaciones Sociales", Eli de Gortari (ed.), Universidad Nacional Autónoma de México 1969 
 "Instant Industrialization and Social Change", in V.L. Urquidi-R. Troeller (eds), Oil, OPEP, and the International Perspective, Fondo de Cultura Económica, México 1977  
 "Crecimiento Cero", in F. Szekeley (ed.), Environmental Issues in Latin America, Nueva Imagen, México, 1978
 "Science and technology in latin America", in Th. Babathunde-M. Wionczek (eds), Integration of Science and Technology with Development, Pergamon Press, New York City, 1979

Monographs 
 "The Ideological Roots of the New International Order", Horowitz Institute, Tel Aviv University, July 1982
 "En torno al capitalismo", IBAFIN, México, septiembre-diciembre 1983
 "Problemas prioritarios en el margo plazo de México", Fundación Javier Barros Sierra, septiembre 1985
 "Ciencia y tecnología en América Latina", Universidad Nacional Autónoma de México, 1986
 "Israel", Universidad Nacional Autónoma de México 1986

Book translation 
 "David Ben Gurión – Visión y Legado" (from Hebrew), Cultura Judaica, México 2008

Articles 
 "Freud como judío", Cuadernos Peruano-israelíes, Lima, 1965
 "Freud y Mannheim", Revista Mexicana de Ciencias Sociales, abril-junio 1968
 "La sociología del desarrollo", Comunidad, México, junio 1969
 "Science and Technology Policies in Latin America: Five National Cases", Tel Aviv University, Israel, 1979
 "Peripheral Scientific Growth in Israel and Latin America", Bar Ilan University, Israel, 1980
 "The Evolution of the New International Order", Tel Aviv University, Israel, 1980
 "Daniel Bell", Revista colombiana de sociología, 1, octubre 1982
 "El aporte de organismos internacionales y regionales a las políticas de ciencia y tecnología en América Latina", Comercio exterior, México, enero 1983
 "Hacia la finlandización de México", Vuelta, México, agosto 1983
 "México: cinco dilemas", Vuelta, México, agosto 1983
 "Cinco retos futuros a la soberanía y a la seguridad de México", ISTOR, México, 39, invierno  2009
 "Kafka: la invensión del padre-Nexos", México, julio 2011
 "El creciente divorcio entre Israel y la Diáspora", ISTOR, México, 46, otoño 2011
 "El inquieto status quo entre laicos y religiosos en Israel", Estudios de Asia y Africa, El Colegio de México, 2014

Contributions to encyclopedias 
 Encyclopedia Judaica, Keter, Jerusalem, Israel 1970
 UNESCO Encyclopedia of Social Sciences, CLACSO-ILDIS, Paris 1976

References

External links 
 Joseph Hodara in Letras Libres (in Spanish)
 Joseph Hodara in academia.edu
 Personal website

Israeli sociologists
Israeli people of Argentine-Jewish descent
Latin Americanists
1938 births
Living people
Academic staff of Bar-Ilan University